Arsen Aleksandrovich Balayan (born 29 April 1972) is a Russian-Uzbekistani football manager and a former player.

References

1972 births
Living people
Sportspeople from Tashkent
Soviet footballers
Uzbekistani footballers
Pakhtakor Tashkent FK players
Russian footballers
FC Fakel Voronezh players
Russian Premier League players
FC Vorskla Poltava players
Russian expatriate footballers
Expatriate footballers in Ukraine
FC Khimik-Arsenal players
Russian football managers
Association football midfielders
FC Tekstilshchik Kamyshin players
Soviet Armenians
Ethnic Armenian sportspeople
Uzbekistani people of Armenian descent